Hexestrol diphosphate (brand names Cytostatin, Cytostesin, Pharmestrin, Retalon Aquosum) is a synthetic, nonsteroidal estrogen of the stilbestrol group related to diethylstilbestrol and used as an estrogen and antineoplastic agent in the treatment of prostate cancer. It is a water-soluble ester of hexestrol. The medication has been known since at least 1956.

See also 
 Hexestrol diacetate
 Hexestrol dicaprylate
 Hexestrol dipropionate

References 

Abandoned drugs
Estrogen esters
Phenols
Phosphate esters
Stilbenoids
Synthetic estrogens